"Asthena" argyrorrhytes is a moth in the family Geometridae first described by Louis Beethoven Prout in 1916. It is found on New Guinea.

Taxonomy
The species does not belong to the genus Asthena or even the tribe Asthenini, but has not been moved to another genus.

References

Moths described in 1916
Asthena
Moths of New Guinea